Kirfi is a Local Government Area of Bauchi State, Nigeria, bordering Gombe State in the east. Its headquarters are in the town of Kirfi (or Kirfin Kasa). The northeasterly line of equal latitude and longitude passes through the LGA. 
 

The predominant ethnic group in the area is the Hausa. The Bure language is also spoken in the LGA.

The postal code of the area is 743.

References

Local Government Areas in Bauchi State